Whitestown is a town in Boone County, Indiana, United States. The population was 10,187 at the 2020 census. Since 2010, Whitestown has been the fastest-growing municipality in Indiana; its population increased more than threefold between the 2010 and 2020 Census tabulations.

History

Whitestown was laid out in 1851 when the railroad was extended to that point. It was named for Albert Smith White, a U.S. Senator from Indiana. The name of the town has at points been noted for being easily perceived as having historical ties to racism in Indiana, despite Albert S. White being known as a leading abolitionist. The first post office in Whitestown was established in 1853.

In the late 2000s, Whitestown annexed 6,500 acres south of the historic downtown district. A master planned, mixed-use development named for U.S. Army officer and Boone County native Anson Mills was established in this area in 2005. The Great Recession adversely impacted the Anson project's original construction schedule, but residential, retail, and commercial growth gained momentum starting in 2011 and continues to this day. The Anson development now features a large selection of retail, including a Meijer supercenter, a Lowe's home improvement store, and several fashion and lifestyle stores including Burlington, Shoe Dept. Encore, TJ Maxx, Hobby Lobby, and Five Below.

From 2010 until current day, Whitestown has been the fastest-growing municipality in Indiana, more than doubling in population between 2010 and 2017.

Whitestown is the home of the Little League Central Region headquarters. In 2021, a new complex opened, including the Central Region Headquarters administration building, a gift shop, and a Little League field with stadium seating, bleachers, a press box, and lights. The complex hosts both the Little League Softball Central Region and the Great Lakes and Midwest Region tournaments.

Geography
Whitestown is located at  (39.996136, -86.344612).

Transportation

Highways
  Interstate 65
  US 52 - concurrent with Interstate 65
  State Road 267

Airports
There are no airports located within Whitestown town limits. The nearest public use airports are:
 Boone County Airport, located approximately 4.4 nautical miles (5.1 mi, 8.2 km) northwest of Whitestown's historic downtown district
 Indianapolis Executive Airport, located approximately 4.9 nautical miles (5.6 mi, 9.1 km) northeast

Railroads and trails

The Lafayette and Indianapolis Railroad line traversing Whitestown was owned and operated by a number of companies from its inception in 1851 until it was abandoned in 1976. In 2015, Whitestown began re-purposing portions of the former railroad line as a shared use path. It is known as the Big 4 Heritage Trail and travels intermittent portions of Boone County, including into nearby Lebanon and Zionsville. The project is expected to be completed in 2023.

Demographics

2010 census
As of the census of 2010, there were 2,867 people, 1,053 households, and 774 families living in the town. The racial makeup of the town was 90.9% White, 2.8% African American, 0.1% Native American, 2.9% Asian, 1.1% from other races, and 2.2% from two or more races. Hispanic or Latino of any race were 3.5% of the population.

There were 1,053 households, of which 44.2% had children under the age of 18 living with them, 60.0% were married couples living together, 8.6% had a female householder with no husband present, 4.8% had a male householder with no wife present, and 26.5% were non-families. Of all households 18.5% were made up of individuals, and 3% had someone living alone who was 65 years of age or older. The average household size was 2.72 and the average family size was 3.14.

The median age in the town was 30 years. 30.6% of residents were under the age of 18; 5.7% were between the ages of 18 and 24; 42% were from 25 to 44; 17.5% were from 45 to 64; and 4.3% were 65 years of age or older. The gender makeup of the town was 50.5% male and 49.5% female.

2000 census
In the census of 2000, there were 471 people, 175 households, and 131 families living in the town. The racial makeup of the town was 99.15% White, 0.21% Asian, and 0.64% from two or more races. Hispanic or Latino of any race were 0.64% of the population.

There were 175 households, out of which 40.6% had children under the age of 18 living with them, 61.7% were married couples living together, 8.0% had a female householder with no husband present, and 24.6% were non-families. Of all households 20.6% were made up of individuals, and 4.0% had someone living alone who was 65 years of age or older. The average household size was 2.69 and the average family size was 3.10.

In the town, the population was spread out, with 29.5% under the age of 18, 5.1% from 18 to 24, 37.4% from 25 to 44, 21.0% from 45 to 64, and 7.0% who were 65 years of age or older. The median age was 35 years. For every 100 females, there were 103.9 males. For every 100 females age 18 and over, there were 100.0 males.

The median income for a household in the town was $46,528, and the median income for a family was $47,917. Males had a median income of $32,031 versus $25,893 for females. The per capita income for the town was $21,674. About 8.1% of families and 7.3% of the population were below the poverty line, including 13.6% of those under age 18 and none of those age 65 or over.

Education

Public school students in Whitestown are served by two systems: those in Worth Township and Perry Township attend schools operated by Lebanon Community School Corporation, while those in Eagle Township attend Zionsville Community Schools.

Traders Point Christian Schools, a private K-12 school operated as a ministry of Traders Point Christian Church, is also located in Whitestown.

No public libraries are located within Whitestown town limits. Whitestown residents are provided library services through contractual agreements with Hussey-Mayfield Memorial Public Library in Zionsville and Lebanon Public Library in Lebanon.

References

External links

 Town website

Indianapolis metropolitan area
Towns in Boone County, Indiana